Luis Montoya may refer to:
 Luis Fernando Montoya, Colombian football manager
 Luis Montoya (badminton), Mexican badminton player